Splendor Solis ("The Splendour of the Sun") is a version of the illuminated alchemical text attributed to Salomon Trismosin. This version dates from around 1582.

The earliest version, written in Central German, is dated 1532–1535 and is part of the Kupferstichkabinett Berlin collection at the State Museums in Berlin. It is illuminated on vellum, with decorative borders like a book of hours, meticulously painted and highlighted with gold. The later copies in London, Kassel, Paris and Nuremberg are equally fine. Twenty versions exist worldwide.

The original of Splendor Solis, which contained seven chapters, appeared in Augsburg. In miniatures the works of Albrecht Dürer, Hans Holbein and Lucas Cranach were used. The author of the manuscript was considered to be the legendary Salomon Trismosin, allegedly the teacher of Paracelsus, though the name is believed to be a pseudonym. The work consists of a sequence of 22 elaborate images, set in ornamental borders and niches. The symbolic process shows the classical alchemical death and rebirth of the king, and incorporates a series of seven flasks, each associated with one of the then-known planets. Within the flasks a process is shown involving the transformation of bird and animal symbols into the Queen and King, the white and the red tincture. Although the style of the Splendor Solis illuminations suggest an earlier date, they are clearly of the 16th century.

Gallery

References

External links 

Splendor solis cards (all 22 cards) for free download in print quality, retrieved 2020-02-17

Alchemical documents
16th-century manuscripts
German manuscripts